Charles Chowkai Yu (born January 3, 1976) is an American writer. He is the author of the novels How to Live Safely in a Science Fictional Universe and Interior Chinatown, as well as the short-story collections Third Class Superhero and Sorry Please Thank You. In 2007 he was named a "5 under 35" honoree by the National Book Foundation. In 2020, Interior Chinatown won the National Book Award for fiction.

Writing 
In 2007, Yu was selected by the National Book Foundation as one of its "5 Under 35", a program which highlights the work of the next generation of fiction writers by asking five previous National Book Award fiction Winners and Finalists to select one fiction writer under the age of 35 whose work they find particularly promising and exciting. Yu was selected for the honor by Richard Powers.

In 2021, Yu established the Betty L. Yu and Jin C. Yu Creative Writing Prizes in collaboration with TaiwaneseAmerican.org.

Short stories
His fiction was cited for special mention in the Pushcart Prize Anthology XXVIII, specifically "Problems for Self-Study" published in the Harvard Review.

Yu also received the 2004 Sherwood Anderson Fiction Award from the Mid-American Review for his story, "Third Class Superhero".

As for editing anthologies, Yu served as the Guest Editor for the Best American Science Fiction and Fantasy 2017 from The Best American Series and the publisher Houghton Mifflin Harcourt.

Novels

How to Live Safely in a Science Fictional Universe

His first novel, How to Live Safely in a Science Fictional Universe, was published and released in 2010 and was ranked that year's second-best science fiction novel by the Center for the Study of Science Fiction at the University of Kansas — and a runner up for the Campbell Memorial Award. The book was also optioned by film director and writer Chris Columbus' production company, 1492 Pictures. The novel was further listed in Time magazine's Top 10 Fiction Books of 2010, The New York Times 100 Notable Books of 2010, and was one of Amazon.com's Top 10 SF/F Books for 2010.

Interior Chinatown

In 2020, Yu released his second novel, Interior Chinatown, which uses the screenplay format to tell the tale of Willis Wu, the "Generic Asian Man" who is stuck playing "Background Oriental Male" and occasionally "Delivery Guy" in the fictional police procedural Black and White but who longs to be "Kung Fu Guy" on screens worldwide. On January 27, 2020, Yu appeared on The Daily Show with Trevor Noah to discuss the book, as well as the lack of on-screen representation for Asian Americans and the Asian American "model minority myth". Yu further appeared on NPR's Weekend Edition with Scott Simon, January 25, 2020, and on the Los Angeles Review of Books Radio Hour with Medaya Ocher and Kate Wolf on February 3, 2020 to further discuss the novel.

Interior Chinatown won the 2020 National Book Award for Fiction, after being announced as a finalist, and made the Long List of the 2021 Andrew Carnegie Medals for Excellence in Fiction and Nonfiction. and was a Finalist or Shortlisted for the 2020 Prix Médicis étranger awards.

In an interview with Timothy Tau for Hyphen, Yu remarked that his influences for the novel included Paul Beatty's Man Booker Prize-winning novel The Sellout as well as the "cyclical structure" of the film Groundhog Day.

Screenplays and TV writing
In 2016, Yu was a story editor for ten episodes of the first season of the 2016 HBO series Westworld, and co-wrote the episode "Trace Decay". For his work on the show, he received two Writers Guild of America Award Nominations in 2017: Drama Series and New Series.

Other writing
Yu's non-fiction, essays, book reviews, journalism and other writing have also appeared online and in print in The Atlantic ( "The Pre-pandemic Universe Was the Fiction"), Slate (various reviews and articles on video games such as L.A. Noire and Portal 2), The Wall Street Journal ("Novelist Charles Yu on St. George California Reserve Agricole Rum"), Time ("What It's Like to Never Ever See Yourself on TV"), The Offing ("Thirteen Ways of Looking at 45" about the 45th president of the United States, Donald Trump), The New York Times Style Magazine ("George R. R. Martin, Fantasy's Reigning King"), McSweeney's Internet Tendency ("What Kind of World Is This?"), The Morning News ("Buffalo Wild Wings Grill & Bar", a review) and Polygon ("What future artificial intelligence will think of our puny human video games").

He is interviewed by and also interviews Lev Grossman in The Believer and comments on the work of Philip Roth (stating that he has "read more books by Roth than probably any other contemporary writer"), Don DeLillo, and Jonathan Lethem in installments of the "Influenced by" series published by Jaime Clarke in The Believer as well.

He has also written reviews in The New York Times Book Review of books (novels or short story collections) from Neal Stephenson, Joe Hill, Jasper Fforde and John Wray.

Personal life 
Yu's parents emigrated to the United States from Taiwan.

Yu graduated from the University of California, Berkeley, majoring and receiving a Bachelor in Arts in molecular and cellular biology and a minor in creative writing, where he "wrote poetry, not fiction" and also "took several poetry workshops with people like Thom Gunn and Ishmael Reed". He obtained his Juris Doctor from Columbia Law School. Yu worked as an associate at Sullivan & Cromwell and Bryan Cave as a corporate attorney, as the Director of Business Affairs at Digital Domain, and as an associate general counsel at Belkin International before becoming a full-time fiction and TV writer.

He lives near Irvine, California, with his wife, Michelle Jue, and their two children, Sophia and Dylan. His brother is the actor and TV writer Kelvin Yu.

Awards and accolades
 2020: National Book Award for Fiction for the novel Interior Chinatown.
2017: Writers Guild of America Award Nominations: Drama Series and New Series for writing on HBO's Westworld.
 2011: The Year's Best Science Fiction & Fantasy for the short story "Standard Loneliness Package", initially published in Lightspeed Magazine November 2010, Issue 6
 2010: Second Place, John W. Campbell Memorial Award for Best Science Fiction Novel for the novel How to Live Safely in a Science Fictional Universe
 2010: Second Best Science Fiction Novel, from the John Wayne and Elsie M. Gunn Center for the Study of Science Fiction at the University of Kansas for the novel How to Live Safely in a Science Fictional Universe
 2007: Named a "5 under 35" honoree by the National Book Foundation by Richard Powers
 2005: Robert Olen Butler Prize for the short story "My Last Days As Me", initially published in Sou'wester
 2004: Sherwood Anderson Fiction Award for the short story "Third Class Superhero", initially published in Mid-American Review, Vol. XXV, No. 2

Bibliography

Novels
 How to Live Safely in a Science Fictional Universe (2010, Pantheon )
 Second Place, John W. Campbell Memorial Award for Best Science Fiction Novel
 Second Best Sci-Fi Novel, The John Wayne and Elsie M. Gunn Center for the Study of Science Fiction, The University of Kansas
 One of Time magazine's Top 10 Fiction Books of 2010
 One of The New York Times''' 100 Notable Books of 2010
 One of Amazon.com's Top 10 SF/F Books for 2010
 Interior Chinatown (2020, Pantheon Books. )
 Winner, 2020 National Book Award for Fiction
 Longlist, 2021 Andrew Carnegie Medals for Excellence in Fiction and Nonfiction
 Finalist/Shortlisted, 2020 Prix Médicis étranger awards

Short story collections
 Third Class Superhero (2006, Harvest Books )
 "Third-Class Hero" originally appearing as "Class Three Superhero" in Mid-American Review , Vol. XXV, No. 2
 The 2004 Sherwood Anderson Fiction Award from Mid-American Review "My Last Days As Me" originally appearing in Sou'wester 
 Reprinted in the Robert Olen Butler Prize Stories 2004 and a 2005 Robert Olen Butler Prize Winner
 "Problems for Self-Study" originally appearing in Harvard Review, Issue No. 23 (Fall 2002) (re-published at Harvard Review Online on April 18, 2011)
 Yu's first published story
 Sorry Please Thank You: Stories (2012, Pantheon Books, Random House. )

Uncollected short stories
 "Systems", The New York Times Magazine, July 7, 2020
 "Bounty", Xprize ANA "Avatars.Inc" Anthology (eBook and also online), March 2020
 The Future of Work: Placebo", Wired, December 17, 2018
 "America, The Ride", Lightspeed, November 2018, Issue 102 (anthologized in Resist: Tales from a Future Worth Fighting Against, edited by Hugh Howey, Gary Whitta & Christie Yant (Broad Reach Publishing 2018))
 "NPC", Lightspeed, September 2018, Issue 100 (anthologized in Press Start to Play, edited by Daniel H. Wilson & John Joseph Adams (Vintage Books 2015))
 "Bookkeeper, Narrator, Gunslinger", Lightspeed, April 2017, Issue 83 (anthologized in Dead Man's Hand: An Anthology of the Weird West, edited by John Joseph Adams (Titan Books, 2014))
 "Subtext®: It Knows What You're Thinking Stop Thinking", Wired, December 13, 2016
 "Fable", The New Yorker, May 23, 2016, Fiction (May 30, 2016 Issue)
 "Re: re: Microwave in the break room doing weird things to fabric of spacetime", Motherboard, Tech by Vice, November 12, 2015

Non-fiction
Essays
 "The Pre-pandemic Universe Was the Fiction", The Atlantic, April 15, 2020
 "What It's Like to Never See Yourself on TV", TIME, January 21, 2020
 "George R. R. Martin, Fantasy's Reigning King", The New York Times Style Magazine, October 15, 2018
 "What Kind of World Is This?", McSweeney's Internet Tendency, September 7, 2018
 "What future artificial intelligence will think of our puny human video games", Polygon, January 9, 2018
 "Buffalo Wild Wings Grill & Bar", The Morning News "Thirteen Ways of Looking at 45", The Offing, May 2, 2017
 "Novelist Charles Yu on St. George California Reserve Agricole Rum", The Wall Street Journal, December 26, 2014
 "Gaming Club 2011: I have seen the future, and it is full of noobs like me.", Slate, December 15, 2011
 "L.A. Noire: The characters in the most realistic video games are still basically puppets.", Slate, December 14, 2011
 "Portal 2: How playing a video game is like writing fiction.", Slate, December 13, 2011

Book reviews
 "Short Stories From Joe Hill, Spiked With Mayhem and Evil", NYT Book Review, October 1, 2019
 "Neal Stephenson's New Novel — Part Tech, Part Fantasy — Dazzles", NYT Book Review, June 14, 2019
 "A Brilliantly Funny and Slightly Bonkers New Novel From Jasper Fforde", NYT Book Review, February 28, 2019
 "‘The Lost Time Accidents,’ by John Wray", NYT Book Review, February 21, 2016
 "‘Seveneves,’ by Neal Stephenson", NYT Book Review, May 31, 2015

Teleplays
 "Trace Decay", Season 1, Episode 8, HBO's Westworld (co-written with Lisa Joy) (original airdate: Nov. 20, 2016)
"Dream Logic", Season 1, Episode 9, HBO's Here and Now (original airdate: April 8, 2018)
 "The Mysteries", Season 1, Episode 6, AMC's Lodge 49 (original airdate: September 10, 2018)
 "Chapter 23", Season 3, Episode 4, FX's Legion (co-written with Olivia Dufault) (original airdate: July 15, 2019)
 "Mr. Greer", Season 2, Episode 4, Facebook Watch's Sorry for Your Loss'' (original airdate: October 8, 2019)

References

External links
 
 SF Encyclopedia entry
 2010 Interview on the Geek's Guide to the Galaxy podcast
 2011 radio interview at The Bat Segundo Show

1976 births
Living people
21st-century American novelists
American male novelists
American people of Taiwanese descent
Columbia Law School alumni
UC Berkeley College of Letters and Science alumni
American writers of Chinese descent
American male short story writers
21st-century American male writers